Jourdan Elizabeth Delacruz (born May 20, 1998) is an American weightlifter. She is a two-time gold medalist at the Pan American Weightlifting Championships. In 2021, she represented the United States at the 2020 Summer Olympics in Tokyo, Japan.

Career 

She won the silver medal in the women's 53 kg event at the 2018 Junior World Weightlifting Championships held in Tashkent, Uzbekistan. In that same year, she competed in the women's 55 kg event at the 2018 World Weightlifting Championships in Ashgabat, Turkmenistan.

At the 2019 Pan American Weightlifting Championships held in Guatemala City, Guatemala, she won the gold medal in the women's 55kg event. She also represented the United States at the 2019 Pan American Games in Lima, Peru in the women's 55 kg event. She finished in 4th place. In that same year, she competed in the women's 55 kg event at the 2019 World Weightlifting Championships held in Pattaya, Thailand. After this competition, she began competing in the 49kg weight class and she won the gold medal in this event at the 2019 International Naim Suleymanoglu Tournament held in Gaziantep, Turkey.

In 2020, she won the gold medal in the women's 49kg event at the Roma 2020 World Cup in Rome, Italy. She also won the gold medals in both the 49kg Snatch and 49kg Clean & Jerk events. In 2021, she won the gold medal in the women's 49kg event at the 2020 Pan American Weightlifting Championships held in Santo Domingo, Dominican Republic. She also won the gold medal in the Snatch and Clean & Jerk events.

She represented the United States at the 2020 Summer Olympics in Tokyo, Japan. She competed in the women's 49kg event where she did not rank after failing to register a result in the Clean & Jerk.

She won the silver medal in her event at the 2022 Pan American Weightlifting Championships held in Bogotá, Colombia. She also won the gold medal in the Clean & Jerk event in this competition. She finished in 7th place in the women's 49kg event at the 2022 World Weightlifting Championships held in Bogotá, Colombia.

Achievements

References

External links 
 

Living people
1998 births
Place of birth missing (living people)
American female weightlifters
Weightlifters at the 2019 Pan American Games
Pan American Games competitors for the United States
Pan American Weightlifting Championships medalists
Weightlifters at the 2020 Summer Olympics
Olympic weightlifters of the United States
21st-century American women